Ludovisi can refer to:

Ludovisi (family), a noble Italian family
Ludovisi papacy of Pope Gregory XV
Cardinals Ludovisi
 Cardinal Alessandro Ludovisi, later Pope Gregory XV
 Cardinal Ludovico Ludovisi (the Pope's Cardinal Nephew and Orazio's son)
 Cardinal Niccolò Albergati-Ludovisi (Ludovico's cousin),  Prince of Piombino 
Non-ecclesiastic family members
Orazio Ludovisi (Pope Gregory XV's brother), Italian military commander and patrician of Bologna
Niccolò Ludovisi (Orazio's son), Prince of Piombino 
Giovan Battista Ludovisi (Niccolò's son), Prince of Piombino 
Olimpia Ludovisi (Niccolò's daughter and grand-niece of two popes)
Ippolita Ludovisi (Niccolò's daughter and grand-niece of two popes)
Villa Ludovisi, a suburban villa in Rome, built in the 17th century for Cardinal Ludovico, destroyed in the 19th century; its territory becoming the Ludovisi rione. 
 Casino di Villa Boncompagni Ludovisi, a remaining portion of the villa, now housing the U.S. Embassy in Italy
 Palazzo Boncompagni Ludovisi, a remaining portion of the villa
 Juno Ludovisi, a colossal Roman marble head from a statue of Antonia Minor as the goddess Juno
 Ludovisi Dionysus, a Roman work of the 2nd century CE, first displayed in front of the Palazzo Grande, at the Villa Ludovisi
 Ludovisi Ares, an Antonine Roman marble sculpture of Mars
 Ludovisi Gaul, a Roman marble group depicting a man in the act of plunging a sword into his breast
Audoenus Ludovisi (Owen Lewis; 1532-1594), Welsh Roman Catholic jurist, administrator, diplomat, and Bishop of Cassano all'Jonio
Francesco Boncompagni Ludovisi (1886–1955), Italian politician
Felice Ludovisi (1912-20), Italian architect and academici
Ludovisi, Lazio, the XVI rione in the City of Rome
Boncompagni Ludovisi Decorative Art Museum, a National Gallery of Modern Art in rome, Italy
Palazzo Ludovisi, a palace in Rome also built for Cardinal Ludovico; now the seat of the Italian Chamber of Deputies
Ludovisi Throne, an sculpted block of white marble hollowed at the back and carved with bas-reliefs on the three outer faces, from about 460 BCE
Great Ludovisi sarcophagus, an ancient Roman sarcophagus dating to around 250–260 AD

See also
 

Italian-language surnames